Carter Memorial Fountain is a fountain in Ashland, Oregon, United States. It features Pioneer Mike (or "Iron Mike"), a statue by Allen George Newman. The fountain and statue are part of the Ashland Downtown Historic District, which is listed on the National Register of Historic Places.

References

External links
 
 Carter Memorial Fountain – Ashland, OR at Waymarking
 Restoration of the Carter Memorial (drinking) Fountain, City of Ashland

Fountains in Oregon
Outdoor sculptures in Ashland, Oregon
Sculptures of men in Oregon
Statues in Oregon
Ashland Downtown Historic District